"Teddy Bear" is a song co-written and recorded by American country music singer Red Sovine. It was released in June 1976 as the title track to Sovine's album of the same name.

The song — actually, a recitation with an instrumental backing — was one of Sovine's many recordings that saluted the American truck driver. "Teddy Bear," released during the height of the citizens' band radio craze of the mid-1970s, is titled after the song's main character, a young paraplegic boy whose semi-trailer truck-driving father had been killed in a road accident, and is left with a CB radio to keep him company.

Content
In the song, the little boy, who refers to himself as "Teddy Bear", gets on the CB radio and asks for somebody to talk to him. The narrator (also an over-the-road truck driver) answers Teddy Bear's call, and listens as the boy tells a heart-rending tale. Aside from his health and the father being deceased, his mother has been forced into the workplace to provide a meager income. Teddy Bear then says his wish had been to go for a ride in a tractor-semitrailer truck (he and his mother were to have joined the father on the road that summer), and is resigned to never getting to realize his dream.

The narrator is so taken by his tale that he decides to risk being late with his delivery to answer the boy's dream. However, when he arrives at the boy's home ("Jackson Street, 229"), numerous truck drivers — who also have been listening to Teddy Bear's call — are lined up at the boy's home, giving him rides in their trucks. The boy thoroughly enjoys his experience.

At the end of the day, the truckers take up a collection for Teddy Bear's mother. Later, his mother ("Mama Teddy Bear") goes on the air to express her gratitude, telling them Teddy Bear's dream had just come true. She offers a special prayer to the truckers for their act of kindness.

Sequels
Two different singles — one by Sovine — were billed as sequels to "Teddy Bear". The two songs told conflicting stories about the boy's future.

Not long after "Teddy Bear" peaked in popularity, singer Diana Williams (who was signed to Capitol Records) released a song called "Teddy Bear's Last Ride." This story, told from the point of view of a friend of Teddy Bear's mother (who cared for the lad while the mother was at work), suggests that the boy's paraplegia is part of a terminal health condition, one that eventually kills him. The song's ending has a group of truck drivers attending the boy's funeral, with one of the semitrailer trucks serving as the hearse. This song was also recorded by Nev Nicholls.

Sovine's follow-up-of-sorts to "Teddy Bear" is "Little Joe" (the tale of a truck driver's dog, who saves his master's life after an accident). In this song, in which Teddy Bear is a character, Sovine says that there was a miracle and that the boy — now older and apparently healthy — could now walk. Teddy Bear is instrumental in helping reunite Little Joe with his now-blinded master. This song was also recorded by Ferlin Husky and Dave Dudley.

Neither song reached the Billboard magazine Hot Country Singles Top 40.

Cover versions
The song has also been recorded by Hank Hill (Mike Judge), Ferlin Husky, Boxcar Willie, The Jackson Southernaires, Australian country singer Nev Nicholls (who also recorded a remake of the sequel), in the Dutch language by Gerard de Vries, and in the German language by Austrian singer Jonny Hill as "Ruf Teddybär eins-vier" (who also recorded a happy-ending sequel "Hallo Teddybär" and a song "Papa, ich bin Teddybär" about his own, handicapped son identifying himself with a teddy bear). A Danish version, titled "Teddybjørn", was recorded by Peter Belli and included on the 1981 album, Er Det Sådan?....

Chart success
Released in June 1976, "Teddy Bear" was the last of three Billboard Hot Country Singles No. 1 hits in Sovine's 25-year recording career.  "Teddy Bear" climbed to #1 in five weeks and was his first since 1966's "Giddyup Go".  In addition, "Teddy Bear" was a crossover hit, peaking at No. 40 on the Billboard Hot 100.

"Teddy Bear" was certified gold for sales of 1 million units by the Recording Industry Association of America.

The song charted in the United Kingdom five years after its original release, in 1981, peaking at #4 on the UK Singles Chart. Diana Williams' song also charted in the UK in the same year, reaching number 54.

Charts

Weekly charts

Year-end charts

Sources
 Roland, Tom, "The Billboard Book of Number One Country Hits" (Billboard Books, Watson-Guptill Publications, New York, 1991

1976 singles
Red Sovine songs
Ferlin Husky songs
1976 songs
Starday Records singles
Citizens band radio in popular culture
Songs about truck driving
Recitation songs
Songs written by Red Sovine